John Tunnicliffe (born 1866) was an English footballer who played in the Football League for Stoke. His brother Billy was also a footballer

Career
Tunnicliffe was born in Hanley and played for Longton Atlas before joining Stoke in 1891. He played in three matches for Stoke during the 1891–92 season. He left the club at the end of the season and joined Audlem.

Career statistics

References

English footballers
Stoke City F.C. players
English Football League players
1866 births
Year of death missing
Association football forwards
Sportspeople from Hanley, Staffordshire